Joaquín Hermida (born 16 August 1921) was a Mexican equestrian. He competed in two events at the 1964 Summer Olympics.

References

External links
 

1921 births
Possibly living people
Mexican male equestrians
Olympic equestrians of Mexico
Equestrians at the 1964 Summer Olympics
Place of birth missing (living people)